Ivan Yevgenyevich Kravtsov (born June 10, 1989, in Minsk, Belarusian SSR) is a political activist, architect, manager, executive secretary of the Coordination Council of the Belarusian Opposition, member of the organising committee of the party "Razam" and the team of presidential candidate in 2020 Belarusian elections Viktar Babaryka.

Early life 
Ivan was born in Minsk on June 10, 1989. His mother, Kravtsova Lyudmila, is a Belarusian pop artist and singer. His father, Yevgeny Kravtsov (deceased in 2012), was a shareholder and chairman of MinskComplexBank, a Minsk-based commercial bank, liquidated in 2005. Grandmother, Kravtsova Halina, is a professor of economics at BSEU.

Career

Pre-politics 
Ivan is also a founder and art director of Architectural bureau 35, based in Minsk. Until May 2019, Ivan Kravtsov worked as Chief Strategy Officer at Minsk Watch Factory "Luch."

2020 Belarusian presidential election 

In May 2020, Ivan Kravtsov joined the campaign team of Belarusian banker and presidential candidate in the 2020 Belarusian presidential elections Viktar Babaryka, as public relations executive manager. On July 28, 2020, together with Maria Kalesnikava and other Viktar Babaryka team members, he petitioned the KGB of Belarus for a change of restraining order of Viktar.

After the election day, on August 18, 2020, political and civic activists formed the Coordination Council. The Coordination Council members aimed at holding talks with the Belarusian authorities on a peaceful transfer of power. Ivan joined the Coordination Council as its Executive Secretary.

On September 1, 2020, Kravtsov was summoned for questioning in the Investigative Committee of the Republic of Belarus. He was interviewed as a witness within the frame of a criminal inquiry under Article 361 of the Criminal Code of Belarus (organization of an extremist group).

Maria Kalesnikava's abduction and criminal charges 

On September 7, 2020, the media reported that the coordinator of the Viktar Babaryka team and one of the political activists, Maria Kalesnikava has disappeared. She had gone missing along with Ivan Kravtsov and the press-secretary of the Coordination Council, Anton Radniankou.

As it turned out later, Kravtsov was escorted to the Financial Investigation Department (FID), where unknown security officials threatened him with 12-year imprisonment. They demanded Kravtsov to bring Kalesnikava out of the country using his private car. According to the officials, the operation was meant to "de-escalate" the political situation in Belarus through its later media coverage as "leaders gave up on the protest movement".

The same day Kravtsov's apartment was searched by FID. Though KGB operatives threatened Maria Kalesnikava with imprisonment or murder, she managed to stay by deliberately tearing up her passport at the Belarus-Ukrainian border. Kravtsov and Radniankou were able to reach Ukraine, despite Alexander Lukashenko announcing the request for the extradition of both.

On September 11, the State Control Committee of the Republic of Belarus opened a criminal case against Kravtsov under Part 4 Article 210 of the Criminal Code of the Republic of Belarus for theft through abuse of power.

On September 17, Ivan Kravtsov applied to the Investigative Committee for opening an investigation over his abduction and illegal extradition.

Party "Razam" 

In August 2020, Viktar Babaryka and Maria Kalesnikava announced the foundation of the "Razam" political party in a video message. They said that soon the team would submit documents for registration of the party. However, Maria Kalesnikova and several other members of the Babaryka team were arrested shortly after. The creation of the political party resumed at the end of March 2021. Ivan Kravtsov joined the organizing committee along with other team members and activists.

See also 
 Viktar Babaryka
 Maxim Znak
 Coordination Council (Belarus)

References 

1989 births
Living people
People from Minsk